The New Zealand national cricket team was due to tour Pakistan during the northern summer of 2008. They would have played three One Day Internationals against Pakistan. The tour was cancelled due to the political situation in the country.

References

2008 in cricket
International cricket competitions in 2008